Neurolaena is a genus of flowering plants in the tribe Neurolaeneae within the family Asteraceae.

 Species

 formerly included
 Neurolaena indenii Sch.Bip. ex A.Gray - Schistocarpha eupatorioides (Fenzl) Kuntze
 Neurolaena liebmannii Sch.Bip. ex Klatt - Schistocarpha bicolor Less.
 Neurolaena lindenii Sch.Bip. ex A.Gray - Schistocarpha eupatorioides (Fenzl) Kuntze
 Neurolaena tenuifolia Sch.Bip. ex Klatt - Bartlettina karwinskiana (DC.) R.M.King & H.Rob.
(See Bartlettina and Schistocarpha.)

References

Neurolaeneae
Asteraceae genera